The fourth season of Supermodel Me or (Supermodel Me: Femme Fatale) aired in 2013, with the shooting location being moved from Singapore to Hong Kong. The judging panel this season include Lisa Selesner, Ase Wang, Dominic Lau and Kim Robinson. Special appearances for the show included:  Kevin Ou, Gordon Lam, Qi Qi, Queenie Chu, Jennifer Tse, Zing, Ananda Everingham, Carmen Soo, Alvin Goh.

This Season 4 have aired, launches on Diva (Asian TV channel), Azio TV, and was subsequently picked up by cable channel AXN, reformatted for television broadcast and shown in 27 countries. Along with weekly television episodes, viewers can follow online webisodes that feature behind-the-scenes footage, extended footage and deleted scenes.

This season will feature 12 contestants; two each from China, Singapore and Vietnam, one each from Hong Kong, India, Japan, Malaysia, the Philippines and Thailand. The prizes for this cycle were a modelling contract with the top agency in Asia, a 12-page editorial spread of Prestige magazine Hong Kong, a cash prize of 35.000S$ and will be the face of AFF Fashion Show 2014.

The winner was 22-year-old Katherine Rigby from Hong Kong.

Contestants
(Ages stated are at time of contest)

Results

 The contestant was eliminated
 The contestant was originally eliminated from the competition but was saved 
 The contestant won the competition
.

Runaway guide
Episode 1 = Insectivora Tunnel Fashion
Episode 2 = Runway Style Of 12 Months
Episode 3 = Upscale End Street Show Above The Lakes In Pairs
Episode 4 = Chinese New Year Special Runway
Episode 5 = Elegance Performance Show Of "Mermaid Fairy Art" Above Water With Fish 
Episode 6 = Survival Runway Challenge
Episode 7 =  High Fashion Catwalk In The Air With The Theme "Hanging Against Gravity With The Obstacle In Fashion"
Episode 8 = "Out Of The Death To Redemption" With Mystique Avant Garde Show
Episode 9 = Caribbean Style Undersea Runway
Episode 10 = Road Of Finale Spectacular Catwalk Show In Ice Lake Resort Canada
Episode 12 = Modern Korean Culture Runway Show At Kyongbokkung Temple,Korean-Pop Superstar Special Finale Catwalk Show

Average  call-out order
Final three is not included.

Bottom three/two

 The contestant was eliminated after their first time in the bottom two/three
 The contestant was eliminated after their second time in the bottom two/three
 The contestant was eliminated after their third time in the bottom two/three 
 The contestant was eliminated after their fourth time in the bottom two/three
 The contestant was eliminated after their fifth time in the bottom two/three
 The contestant was eliminated in the first round of elimination and placed third
 The contestant was eliminated and placed as the runner-up

References

2013 Singaporean television seasons